The jazz album Dedications II was recorded by two configurations of the Toshiko Akiyoshi Trio in Los Angeles in April 1977.  It was released by Discomate Records (and later by Alfa Records) in Japan and by Inner City Records (as simply Dedications) in the USA.

Track listing
LP side A
"Swingin' till the Girls Come Home" (Pettiford) – 6:17
"Israel" (Carisi) – 5:05
"Solar" (Davis) – 5:21
LP side B
"Two Bass Hit" (Lewis, Gillespie) – 3:10
"Enigma" (Johnson) – 4:58
"In Your Own Sweet Way" (Brubeck) – 5:19
"Tempus Fugit" (Powell) – 5:00

Personnel
Tracks A1, 3, B2, 4:
Toshiko Akiyoshi – piano
Jimmie Smith – drums
Bob Daugherty – bass

Tracks A2, B1, 3:
Toshiko Akiyoshi – piano
Peter Donald – drums
Andy Simpkins – bass

References / external links
Discomate DSP-5006
Inner City 6046
Alfa Records (Japan) ALCR-162
[ Allmusic]

Toshiko Akiyoshi albums
1977 albums